Steve Benson may refer to:

Steve Benson (cartoonist) (born 1954), American editorial cartoonist
Steve Benson (poet) (born 1949), American poet and performer
Stephen Allen Benson (1816–1865), president of Liberia
Steven Benson (murderer) (1951–2015), American convicted double murderer
Steve Benson, pseudonym of Dieter Bohlen, German producer and ex-member of Modern Talking
Steve Benson, character in Frank Perreti's novel The Oath